Kawal is a village in the Muzaffarnagar district of western Uttar Pradesh in northern India.
When it comes to western Uttar Pradesh, Kaval cannot be forgotten. Kawal is a town situated in the Tehsil Janasath of Muzaffarnagar district, which was once famous for its Tehzeeb in the name of Chhota Lucknow in Hindustan. This village was founded by the Nawab Munshi of Kawal.  Bashir and Khan Sahab Abdurrahman's ancestors

There was a time when there were two princely states in Muzaffarnagar, one thousand

Here (ruled by Nawab Abdullah Khan and Hasan Ali Khan, both of these brothers were famous in the world as Sayyid brothers) and there was a princely state of Kawal, it was related to Qureshi fraternity (ruled by Nawab Munshi Bashir and Khan Sahab Abdur Rahman  ) The decision was a line of stone.

The relations of the princely states of Kawal and Jansath were very good, the Nawabs of both the princely states used to visit each other's house.
The descendants of Nawab Munshi Bashir and Khan Sahib Abdur Rahman still reside in this village.

History 
In 2013, a dispute between Hindus and Muslims in Kawal triggered the 2013 Muzaffarnagar riots. On 7 September 2013, over 150,000 people from the neighbouring states of Haryana and Delhi gathered in Kawal village for a "Jat Mahapanchayat", many of them carrying weapons. There had been allegations of a Muslim man harassing a Hindu girl followed by the murder of two young Jat men and a Muslim youth. The gathering was called to show solidarity of Hindu groups against Muslims. After the gathering, scores of vehicle carrying peacefully returning Jat youth were burned and many of the bodies were never recovered, as per estimate 23 tractors and 7 bikes were burned and washed away in Ganges till Bulandshahar but SDM of Jansat only reported 13 in his report to then CM and PM. Many of the victims reportedly killed were Gyanendra Singh (chairman of Nagar Panchayat Bhokhrahi), Udayveer Singh Rampal, Pratap Singh and Manoj from Rahmatpur village, Ajay Kumar of Rahmatpur, Sonveer Singh of Bhokhrahi and Brijpal of Baseda. In other incidents , by 8 September, "over 50 people had already been murdered, a number of women allegedly raped, and several thousand people displaced.". Girls from the village stopped going to school and requested then chief Minister of U.P. Akhilesh Yadav to provide alternate road to their school. All 7 accused of the murder of the  Jat boys have been awarded life imprisonments by Muzaffarnagar District court in Feb 2019 while the counter-case towards the Jat men is still going and charges have framed.

Geography

Demographics
Its population is approximately 12,000. It is a very sensitive village in terms of both the communities.

References

Villages in Muzaffarnagar district